Somali National Television (SNTV) is the national television station of Somalia.

History
The first regular TV services began in Somalia on 17 August 1983, with funds obtained from Kuwait and the United Arab Emirates with broadcasting (in Somali and Arabic) two hours daily and three hours on Fridays and holidays, ceasing its operation during the civil war.

Re-launch
On March 18, 2011, the Ministry of Information of the Transitional Federal Government began experimental broadcasts of the new television channel. After a 20-year hiatus, the station was shortly thereafter officially re-launched on April 4, 2011.

SNTV broadcasts 24 hours a day, and can be viewed both within Somalia and abroad via terrestrial and satellite platforms.

Somali National Television is the principal public service broadcaster in Somalia. Headquartered in Mogadishu, the nation's capital, its main responsibility is to provide public service broadcasting throughout the country.

SNTV is regulated by the Ministry of Information, Posts & Telecommunication of the Somali Council of Ministers.

See also
Radio Mogadishu
Media of Somalia
Shabelle Media Network
Somali Broadcasting Corporation
Somaliland National TV
Horn Cable Television
Universal Television (Somalia)

Notes

References
After 20 years, Somali president inaugurates national TV station
Somalia launches national TV

External links 
 Official website

Television channels in Somalia
Mass media in Mogadishu
Television channels and stations established in 1983
Television channels and stations established in 2011